is a Japanese name which historically referred to the lands to the north of the Japanese island of Honshu.

Ezo may also refer to:

Places and peoples
 Hokkaido, formerly known as Ezo, the second largest island of Japan
 Republic of Ezo, a short-lived state in 1869 on Hokkaido
 Ainu people, in the historical Japanese texts Ezo, an indigenous people of Japan
 Ezo, South Sudan

Species
 Ezo (alga), a genus of red algae in the subfamily Lithophylloideae
 Ezo red fox, Vulpes vulpes schrencki, a subspecies of red fox
 Hokkaido wolf, Canis lupus hattai, also known as the Ezo wolf
 Patinopecten yessoensis, the Yesso scallop or Ezo giant scallop, a species of scallop
 Ezo salamander, Hynobius retardatus, a species of salamander
 Ezo flying squirrel

Other uses
 Ezo (band), a Japanese heavy metal band 1982–1990
EZO (album)

See also
Yeso (disambiguation)